The 1978–79 Challenge Cup was the 78th staging of rugby league's oldest knockout competition, the Challenge Cup. Known as the State Express Challenge Cup due to sponsorship by State Express 555, the final was contested by Widnes and Wakefield Trinity at Wembley. Widnes won the match 12–3.

Widnes beat Wakefield Trinity 12-3 at Wembley in front of a crowd of 94,218.

This was Widnes' fifth cup final win in seven Final appearances. To date, this was Wakefield Trinity’s last appearance in a Challenge Cup final.

Despite being on the losing side, the Wakefield Trinity , David Topliss, won the Lance Todd Trophy.

First round

Second round

Quarter-finals

Semi-finals

Final

References

External links
Challenge Cup official website 
Challenge Cup 1978/79 results at Rugby League Project

Challenge Cup
Challenge Cup
1979 in Welsh rugby league